The BBC Radio 2 Young Folk Award is an annual competition for young folk musicians in the United Kingdom. It was first awarded in 1988 as the Young Tradition Award, taking its present name in 1998. Recent winners of the award include Brighde Chaimbeul, Talisk and Greg Russell & Ciaran Algar.

Competition
The Young Tradition Award was a competition for young players of traditional music which was awarded annually between 1988 and 1996. BBC presenter Jim Lloyd wanted to get funding and publicity for young folk musicians in the same way that young classical musicians were helped by the BBC Young Musician award, and in 1988 he created the Young Tradition Award with a grant of £500 from the Ralph Vaughan Williams Trust. The title was a tribute to the 1960s folk group The Young Tradition.

The following year the award was adopted by the BBC programme Folk On 2 which Lloyd presented. Over the next six years, competitors included Carlene Anglim, Damien Barber, Pauline Cato, MacLaine Colston, Luke Daniels, Ingrid Henderson and Catriona MacDonald.
In 1994 Lloyd wrote that the Award had been expanded to include traditional singers as well as instrumentalists, restricted to professional or semi-professional artists, and associated with a bursary of £1,000.
Lloyd retired from the BBC at the end of 1997, and a Young Tradition big band including all the previous winners performed on his final Folk On 2 programme.

The BBC recreated an award from 1998, calling it the BBC Radio 2 Young Folk Award. Until 2005, the competition was run by Folkworks on behalf of the BBC. The entry criteria in 2005 were that the event was "open to anyone aged between fifteen and twenty, performing as a band, duo or soloist and performing traditional and acoustic music with roots in any culture", and these criteria have remained largely unchanged in subsequent years.
The short-listed finalists are invited to a residential weekend, as part of which they will perform in a public concert at which the winner is chosen by a judging panel.

Since 2011 the winner of the Young Folk Award has been announced at the main BBC Radio 2 Folk Awards, which are broadcast on BBC Radio 2 with some highlights also televised. However the selection process for the Young Folk Award remains independent.

Young Folk Award finalists (1998–present)

2019
 Maddie Morris
 The selection process changed again for the 2019 award. There were eight shortlisted acts, but only the winner was officially announced. Some of the finalists have identified themselves, including Jon Doran.

2018
 

2017
 

2016
 

2015
 

2014
 

2013
 

2012
 

 2011
 

 The number of finalists was reduced from six to four this year.

 2010
 

 2009
 

 2008

 

 2007
 
 

2006
 
 

2004/5
 
 

2003
 
 

2002
 
 

2001
 

2000
 

1999
422

 1998 
 Tim Van Eyken

Young Tradition Award finalists (1988–1996)
Information about the nominees in the earlier years is scarce. 

 1996

 1995

 1994
Kathryn Roberts

 1993
 Carlene Anglim

 1992
 Luke Daniels

 1991
Catriona MacDonald
 Finalists this years included Saul Rose.

 1990
Ingrid Henderson

 1989
 Simon Thoumire
 Thoumire notes that the finalists included Becky Taylor, and Coxon's article quotes her. Damien Barber was also a finalist.

 1988
Lynn Tocker
 Thoumire relates that he met duo partner  Ian Carr among the finalists of the first competition, and Coxson's article quotes Andy Cutting on his participation.

See also
 BBC Radio 2 Folk Awards
 BBC Radio Scotland Young Traditional Musician

References

External links
 

BBC Radio 2 programmes
Young Folk
Folk music awards